A total solar eclipse occurred on April 8 New Style (NS), 1652, a Monday. In contemporary British sources, the date is alternately listed as March 29, 1652 following the Old Style (OS) as Great Britain had not yet adopted of the Gregorian Calendar by that time. 19th century authors further adjusted the date to March 25 NS, 1652. A solar eclipse occurs when the Moon passes between Earth and the Sun, thereby totally or partly obscuring the image of the Sun for a viewer on Earth. A total solar eclipse occurs when the Moon's apparent diameter is larger than the Sun's, blocking all direct sunlight, turning day into darkness. Totality occurs in a narrow path across Earth's surface, with the partial solar eclipse visible over a surrounding region thousands of kilometres wide.
The path of totality intersected the British Isles, as well as passing just off the west coast of Norway.

Observations 
Observing the eclipse from Carrickfergus, Ireland, Dr. John Wybard wrote in Latin:

 "Luna momento quasi, et eximproviso, totam se intra Disci Solis orbitam seu ambitum (quatenus conspectui nostro appareret) tam agiliter injiciebat; ut circumagere aut circumvolutare videretur, sicut catillus, seu lapis molaris superior; Sole tunc circum-circa, ejus limbum seu marginem splendidulo vel corusco, apparente.”

 "The Moon, as if at that moment, and unexpectedly, threw itself so very nimbly between the entire path or circuit of the Sun’s disc (in so far as it appeared to our sight); so that it seemed to move in a circle or roll around, like a plate or upper mill-stone; with the Sun, glowing or rather shimmering, all around its rim or edge."

Because this eclipse occurred on a Monday that day became popularly known as Mirk Monday.

Related eclipses 
It is a part of solar Saros 133.

See also 
 List of solar eclipses visible from the United Kingdom 1000–2090 AD

Notes

References
 NASA chart graphics
 Googlemap
 NASA Besselian elements

1652 04 08
1652 in science
1652 04 08